Mastax parreyssi is a species of beetle in the family Carabidae found in Algeria, Cameroon, Chad, Egypt, Ethiopia, Ivory Coast, Israel and Sudan.

References

Mastax parreyssi
Beetles of Africa
Beetles of Asia
Beetles described in 1850